Brownstone is an American female contemporary R&B group that was popular during the mid-1990s. They are best known for their 1994 hit single "If You Love Me", which was nominated for a Best R&B Performance Grammy Award. "Grapevyne", "5 Miles to Empty" and "Pass the Lovin'" also brought them some success, as well as their rendition of "I Can't Tell You Why", a song originally recorded by The Eagles.

In 2019, it was announced that Brownstone were to reunite with founding members Nicci Gilbert and Mimi Doby, alongside returning member Teisha Brown for the 25th anniversary of the Essence Festival in July, as well the 25th anniversary of the group.

Career
The three original members of Brownstone were Monica "Mimi" Doby, Charmayne Maxena "Maxee" Maxwell and Nichole "Nicci" Gilbert. Founded in Los Angeles, the singers met each other after attending various auditions around the city. They formed the group and were signed to Michael Jackson's MJJ Music record label less than a year later. The group soon recorded its debut album From the Bottom Up, which spawned the hit singles "If You Love Me" and "Grapevyne." In 1995, the group earned a Grammy Award nomination and a Billboard Music Award. After extensive touring around the globe, Doby left the group for health reasons; in an interview with BET Video Soul host Donnie Simpson, the problem was cited as bronchitis. The cause of her split from the group was later said (in radio interviews) to be internal strife with the other two members. She was replaced by Kina Cosper of Detroit; other members over the years includes Kymberli Wright of Detroit, Racquel Roberts of Los Angeles and Teisha Brown of Detroit.

After a difficult transition period, Brownstone released the song "5 Miles to Empty" from their sophomore album Still Climbing. In 1998, Brownstone was featured on the soundtrack for the film The Players Club with the song "Don't Play Me Wrong".

Charmayne Maxena "Maxee" Maxwell died on February 27, 2015, at age 46 following what has been reported publicly as an accidental fall.

2019: Brownstone's 25th anniversary 
In February 2019, it was announced that Brownstone were to reunite for a one-off performance for the 25th anniversary of the Essence Music Festival with founding members Nicci Gilbert, Mimi Doby, and returning member Teisha Brown, as well as the 25th anniversary of the group. During an interview with former member Kina Cosper, she expressed that she was invited to perform alongside Gilbert and Doby, but that she "respectfully declined."

2022-present: New music 
During the Centennial Boule (July 2022), all three members were inducted into Sigma Gamma Rho Sorority, Inc. On September 13, 2022, Brownstone's newest line-up, composed of founding member Nicci Gilbert, Teisha Brown and new member Arin Jackson, announced the release of the group's new single "All I Want" on September 30, 2022. It has been announced, Teisha Brown has departed the group and has been replaced by Arin's sister Alexis Jones.

In 2023, Brownstone has released their live cover of "Ain't No Mountain High Enough" from their upcoming Live covers album.

Discography

Studio albums
 From the Bottom Up (1995)
 Still Climbing (1997)

Members

Current members
 Nichole "Nicci" Gilbert (1994–1998, 2007–2015, 2019–present)
 Arin Jackson (2019–present)
 Alexis Jones (2022-present)

Former members
 Monica "Mimi" Doby (1994–1995, 2019)
 Charmayne "Maxee" Maxwell (1994–1998, 2007–2015)
 Kina Cosper (1995–1997)
 Teisha Brown (2007–2015, 2019–2022)

Awards and nominations

References

External links
 Billboard.com (2006) Discography – Brownstone
 Billboard.com (2006) Artist Chart History – Brownstone

American contemporary R&B musical groups
African-American women singers
African-American girl groups
Ballad music groups
Musical groups established in 1994
Musical groups disestablished in 1998
Musical groups reestablished in 2014
Musical groups reestablished in 2019